Wotton under Edge Friary was a friary of the Crutched Friars in Wotton-under-Edge, Gloucestershire, England.

It was founded in 1347.

References

Monasteries in Gloucestershire
Wotton-under-Edge